Justin Flom (born April 29, 1986) is an American illusionist. He is best known for his YouTube series along with his television show Wizard Wars in which he performs magic with ordinary objects.  Along with his video and television work, he performs live with either his own touring show or opening for music acts in large venues.

Early life
Born in Edina, Minnesota, Flom was raised in a family of magicians (his father and uncle were practicing magicians). He has two brothers and a sister. Flom started  doing magic at an early age with his siblings. He was homeschooled.

Career

Branson, Missouri, 2005–2009
In 2005 Justin skipped college and instead took his show to The Branson Mall Music Theatre in Branson, Missouri where he was the youngest headliner on the strip. He built above the Majestic Steak House, The Imaginary Theatre and Magic Parlor, which opened July 1, 2006 In 2011, wanting to make more magic videos online, he began working on new tricks.

YouTube 2012–2013
Justin’s Magic Block Party, filmed in Eden Prairie summer of 2012, caught the eye of Ellen DeGeneres and she put him on The Ellen DeGeneres Show. He then became a regular guest on her show. Flom was named Best Up and Coming Entertainer of the Year by Las Vegas Weekly.

2014 
In 2014, James Galea formed the Band of Magicians with Justin Flom, Justin Willman, and Nate Staniforth.

In 2014, Syfy Television network filmed a new show, Wizard Wars, starring Justin Flom along with Penn and Teller and several other magicians competing to create magic out of ordinary objects on the spot. Justin is also an associate producer of Wizard Wars and the show is based on an idea of Rick Lax's from Justin's YouTube channel. Justin is lead Wizard on the series. Over a million people watched the Wizard Wars series premiere. The episode highlighted Canadian illusionists Chris Funk and Ekaterina, who ended up losing the "Wizard War" to Justin.

2015–2017 
Justin played a part in a WWE storyline on Smackdown showing magic to the superstars backstage and smashing an egg on the face of The Miz, further adding to the rift between him and Mizdow (also known as Damien Sandow). Justin was on promoting the new season of Wizard Wars which followed that January 29, 2015 episode of Smackdown.

In 2015, Justin opened for country music group Florida Georgia Line on their arena tour.

Most of Flom's time is spent making YouTube and Snapchat videos while performing live magic around the United States. His wife, Jocelynn Flom, films all the videos while Justin personally edits the footage.

2018 
2018 opened with Justin Flom's online videos reaching new levels of share-ability with Sawing a Baby in Half, in which he performed the classic "sawing a lady in half" but with his 4-month-old daughter, and with various other magic effects all exceeding 100 million views.

2019 
Justin was a contestant on The World's Best where he advanced to the champion rounds.

2020s 
During the worldwide pandemic, Justin started creating Facebook videos full-time and became one of the top 5 U.S. Facebook pages with the highest reach beating out Donald Trump and Fox News.  In 2020 alone his content has had 6.4 billion minutes viewed on Facebook's platform. 

Between 2020 and 2022, Justin filmed over 2,000 videos with views totaling over 20 billion on Facebook. His page was the most viewed Facebook page worldwide for the month of January 2022 and February of the same year.  As a magician, Justin often exposes long-guarded trade secrets of magic tricks. Criticism was leveled at Flom by magicians, and he was barred from several magic organizations.

Personal life
Justin married Jocelynn Sharp in 2009. The couple then moved to Las Vegas to partner with top magic creators.

In late-2020, he was hospitalized with sepsis complicated with a cardiac embolism, which was brought on by an infected paper cut.

In Spring 2021 Justin and Jocelynn split up.

References

External links

 Official Website

Living people
American magicians
People from Eden Prairie, Minnesota
1986 births